This is a list of the National Register of Historic Places listings in Dodge County, Wisconsin. It is intended to provide a comprehensive listing of entries in the National Register of Historic Places that are located in Dodge County, Wisconsin.  The locations of National Register properties for which the latitude and longitude coordinates are included below may be seen in a map.

There are 37 properties and districts listed on the National Register in the county. Another two properties were once listed but have been removed.

Current listings

|}

Former listings

|}

See also

List of National Historic Landmarks in Wisconsin
National Register of Historic Places listings in Wisconsin
Listings in neighboring counties: Columbia, Dane, Fond du Lac, Green Lake, Jefferson, Washington, Waukesha

References

 
Dodge